Peritia is an annual peer-reviewed academic journal covering Celtic and Insular medieval studies in the context of the European Middle Ages and European medieval studies in general. It is published by the Medieval Academy of Ireland.

History
Founded and edited by Donnchadh Ó Corráin of University College Cork since the early 1980s until 2016, Ó Corráin passed on this role to

Dáibhí Ó Cróinín (NUI Galway) and Elva Johnston (University College Dublin). Ó Cróinín's work had featured in the first edition. Patrick Wormald also noted two "firsts" in English language scholarship in his review of that edition: Jonas's great life of Columbanus being given its first "sustained treatment" in the language (by Ian N. Wood) and a description of "the beginnings of hagiographical writing in Iceland".
The Irish Times has credited the journal with featuring the work of scholars who might elsewhere have been neglected.

Publication history
The journal is published by Brepols. It has been available since the early 1980s.

Notes

References

1980s establishments in Ireland
Annual journals
Celtic studies
English-language journals
European history journals
Publications established in the 1980s
Brepols academic journals